East Williston Village Historic District is a national historic district located at East Williston in Nassau County, New York. It includes 26 contributing buildings and one contributing site.  It encompasses the largely intact 19th and early 20th century residential and commercial core of the village.  The earliest extant building is the Willis farmhouse, dated to the early 19th century.  The district's commercial center is Station Plaza, located at the 19th century railroad station.

It was listed on the National Register of Historic Places in 1985.

References

External links
East Williston Village Historic District (Living Places)

Historic districts on the National Register of Historic Places in New York (state)
Historic districts in Nassau County, New York
National Register of Historic Places in Nassau County, New York